Lychas is a genus of scorpions belonging to the family Buthidae. It is one of the most widespread genus of the scorpions, where the species are found throughout in Africa and Seychelles, and in the Oriental region from India to Melanesia.

Description
Total length is 21.8 to 90 mm. Sternum type 1 is subpentagonal or subtriangular. Pedipalps are orthobothriotaxic. Cheliceral fixed finger with a single ventral denticle. Third and fourth legs consists with tibial spurs. Pectines have conspicuous or inconspicuous fulcra, but rarely can be without fulcra. 
There are about 8 to 26 pectinal teeth. Movable fingers of pedipalps consist with six rows of granules. Total number of terminal granules is 6 or 7. Carapace with horizontal entire dorsal surface laterally. Telson with a distinct subaculear tooth.

Species
There are about 42 species.

Lychas aberlenci 
Lychas americanus 
Lychas annulatus Glauert, 1925
Lychas armasi Kovarík, 2013
Lychas armillatus (Gervais, 1841)
Lychas asper (Pocock, 1891)
Lychas biharensis Tikader & Bastawade, 1983
Lychas brehieri Lourenço, 2017
Lychas buchardi Kovarík, 1997
Lychas buchari Kovařík, 1997
Lychas cernickai Kovarík, 2013
Lychas flavimanus (Thorell, 1888)
Lychas gravelyi Henderson, 1913
Lychas hendersoni (Pocock, 1897)
Lychas hillyardi Kovarík, 1997
Lychas inexpectatus Lourenço, 2011
Lychas jonesae Glauert, 1925
Lychas kamshetensis Tikader & Bastawade, 1983
Lychas kharpadi Bastawade, 1986
Lychas krali Kovarík, 1995
Lychas lappa Glauert, 1954
Lychas lourencoi Kovarík, 1997
Lychas mabillanus Rochebrune, 1884
Lychas marmoreus (C.L.Koch, 1844)
Lychas melanodactylus Koch, 1867
Lychas mjobergi Kraepelin, 1916
Lychas mucronatus (Fabricius, 1798)
Lychas nigristernis (Pocock, 1899)
Lychas obsti Kraepelin, 1913
Lychas paraensis Koch, 1845
Lychas perfidus (Keyserling, 1885)
Lychas rackae Kovarík, 1997
Lychas rugosus (Pocock, 1897)
Lychas santoensis Lourenço, 2009
Lychas scaber (Pocock, 1893)
Lychas scutilus C.L.Koch, 1845
Lychas serratus (Pocock, 1891)
Lychas shelfordi (Borelli, 1904)
Lychas spinatus Kraepelin, 1916
Lychas srilankanensis Lorenco, 1997
Lychas truncatus Glauert, 1925
Lychas variatus (Thorell, 1876)

References

 
Scorpion genera